Harry Verney may refer to:

 Sir Harry Verney, 2nd Baronet (1801–1894), British politician, MP for Buckingham three times between 1832 and 1885
 Sir Harry Verney, 4th Baronet (1881–1974), British politician, MP for Buckingham 1910–1918
 Harry Lloyd Verney (1872–1950), British courtier

See also
 Verney baronets